Nando Angelini (17 August 1933 – 7 August 2020) was an Italian actor. He appeared in more than eighty films since 1957.

Life and career
Born in San Benedetto del Tronto, Angelini enrolled at the Centro Sperimentale di Cinematografia, graduating in 1955. Very active as a character actor, he was sometimes credited as Nick Angel and Fernand Angels. Besides his acting career, he worked for RAI as a documentarist and a television writer of educational programs.

Filmography

References

External links 

1933 births
2020 deaths
Italian male film actors
20th-century Italian male actors
Centro Sperimentale di Cinematografia alumni